Chamus is a genus of Miridae or capsid bugs in the tribe Dicyphini and subtribe Odoniellina. Species can be found in central and southern Africa, with the type C. wealei first described by Distant in 1904.

Species
The Global Biodiversity Information Facility lists:
 Chamus conradsianus Schouteden, 1942
 Chamus incertus Reuter & Poppius, 1911
 Chamus mefisto Reuter & Poppius, 1911
 Chamus overlaeti Schouteden, 1942
 Chamus reuteri Poppius, 1914
 Chamus schroederi Poppius, 1912
 Chamus wealei Distant, 1904 - type species (synonym C. ghesquierei Schouteden, 1942)

References

External links
 

Miridae genera
Hemiptera of Africa